Jordan Seiler is a New York-based public space artist known for his long-term project titled "PublicAdCampaign" for which he takes over billboards to use as canvases for his own pieces. Seiler's works are characterized by minimalistic formal style and concentration on graphic shapes. With Jowy Romano, he created an app called "No Ads" which attempts to replace advertisements in photographs taken with the phone with artwork.

References

External links 
 PublicAdCampaign website
 

Living people
Artists from New York City
Date of birth missing (living people)
Place of birth missing (living people)
Year of birth missing (living people)